Road to Nhill is a 1997 Australian comedy-drama film directed by Sue Brooks. The film won the "Golden Alexander" (first prize) for Best Feature-Length Film at The International Thessaloniki Film Festival (Greece).

Produced by Sue Maslin, it was shot on location in Pyramid Hill, Victoria.

Plot
A car carrying four lady lawn bowlers on its way to Nhill is involved in an accident on a deserted road in rural Victoria. Locals, not knowing where the accident was, or who was involved, embark on a journey to assist.

Box office
Road to Nhill grossed $884,949 at the box office in Australia,.

See also
Cinema of Australia

References

External links
Road To Nhill at the National Film and Sound Archive
 
Road to Nhill at Oz Movies

1997 films
Australian comedy-drama films
1997 comedy-drama films
Films directed by Sue Brooks
1990s English-language films
1990s Australian films
English-language comedy-drama films